= Modern Mistakes =

Studio album by Glenn Robinson
- Released: October 7, 2013
- Recorded: 2012–2013
- Genre: Rock, Alternative Rock, Pop Punk
- Length: 26:00
- Label: Jolly Ronnie Records (CD); Wreck Kidz Lbl (digital)
- Producer: Chris Piquette

Modern Mistakes is American songwriter Glenn Robinson's debut full-length album, released on October 7, 2013 on Jolly Ronnie Records.

The songs on Modern Mistakes were recorded sporadically between late 2012 through mid-2013 at No Boundaries Studios. The tracks "The Worst", "Desperate with Standards", "I Really Shouldn't Bother" and "Fire in the Hole!" originally appeared on his 2012 EP, Total Fiasco. The songs "Wavelengths" and "Gimme Insanity" were originally released together, digitally, in March 2013.

== Track listing ==
No.	Title	Length
1.	"The Worst"	03:00
2.	"Gimme Insanity"	02:53
3.	"Wavelengths"	02:43
4.	"Desperate With Standards"	02:35
5.	"Outta My Head"	02:41
6.	"Tambourine"	02:35
7.	"The Last Winner"	02:22
8.	"I Really Shouldn't Bother"	02:33
9.	"Hang Around and Stay Awhile"	02:46
10.	"Fire in the Hole!"	02:55

== Personnel ==
- Glenn Robinson - drums, guitar, bass, vocals
- Chris Piquette - guitar leads on Gimme Insanity andTambourine
- Brian Shovelton - guitar leads on The Worst and I Really Shouldn't Bother
- Sean Brown - harmonica on Wavelengths
- Additional background vocals - Justin "Juice" McGovern, Tom Moran, and Chris Piquette

== Reception ==
- Real Gone Rocks – ""Prepare to add Glenn Robinson to your ever-growing list of heroes..." (about Glenn Robinson's album, "Modern Mistakes")
- Pop That Goes Crunch - ""Its anchored throughout by Robinson's keen feel for melody, making the ten brief tracks on Modern Mistakes fly by in couple of a head-bopping moments" (about Glenn Robinson's album, "Modern Mistakes")
- Power Pop Academy (Japan) - ""Green Day meets Elvis Costello...""
- Kool Kat Music - ""It's brimming with classic pop-punk aggression and melodies that shine through and carry you from start to finish...A fantastic debut that is made to be played at MAXIMUM VOLUME only!"" (about Glenn Robinson's album, "Modern Mistakes")
